Corine Cécile Franco (née Petit) (born 5 October 1983 in La Rochelle) is a retired French football player who is best known for having played for France and Olympique Lyonnais of the Division 1 Féminine. Franco served as vice-captain of the French club and played as a physical, yet creative defensive midfielder, often acting as a deep-lying playmaker. She was often utilized as a right back at international level.

Franco is one of the most decorated players at club level in women's professional football, having won five European Cups and 10 Division 1 Féminine trophies.

She competed for France at the 2012 Summer Olympics.

Club career

Early career 

Franco was born on the west coast of France and began her career playing for Avenir Maritime Laleu in her hometown. She later moved to ES Rochellaise before securing a move to D1 Féminine club ASJ Soyaux at the start of the millennium. Franco spent two years in the youth system before making her league debut during the 2002–03 season. In her debut season, she scored four goals. The 2003–04 season saw Franco's opportunities in the team increase as she was given a permanent role in the starting eleven. Over the next four seasons, she appeared in all 22 matches scoring double-digit goals on two occasions. In her final season with Soyaux, she appeared in 19 matches scoring seven goals. Her successful seven-year career gained the attention of defending champions Olympique Lyonnais and Franco eventually secured a move to the club.

Lyon 

In Franco's first season with Lyon, she appeared in 19 matches, starting 17, and scored two goals en route to Lyon winning their second straight D1 Féminine title and Franco's first of her career. The 2008–09 season also gave Franco the opportunity to display her talents on the European stage as Lyon were participating in the 2008–09 UEFA Women's Cup. Lyon cruised through the group stage portion of the tournament and in the knockout rounds, they faced Italian club A.S.D. CF Bardolino. Lyon won the tie 9–1 on aggregate as Franco scoring a goal in both legs. Lyon eventually suffered elimination in the semi-finals to German club FCR 2001 Duisburg.

On 15 October 2010, it was confirmed by Lyon officials that Franco suffered a rupture of her anterior cruciate ligament, as well as her medial meniscus and lateral meniscus in her right knee. She suffered the injury while playing in a UEFA Women's Champions League match against AZ Alkmaar. Franco missed six months.

She retired at the end of the 2017—2018 football season, after having won the domestic league and Champions League titles with Lyon.

International career 

Franco made her international debut on 22 February 2003 in a 2–1 loss to China. She scored her first international goal three days later in a 2–1 victory over the Netherlands. During qualification for the UEFA Women's Euro 2009, she scored one goal against Greece. In the tournament, she appeared in all 4 matches France contested. France reached as far as the quarterfinals losing to the Netherlands 4–5 on penalties with Franco missing her penalty shot. On 23 September 2009, she scored a brace against Serbia in a 2011 FIFA Women's World Cup qualification match. France won the match 7–0. A month later, she scored a goal in another qualification match, this time against Estonia in a 12–0 victory.

Franco made her last international appearance in 2–3 win over Australia on 7 March 2014.

Career statistics

Club 

Statistics accurate as of match played 8 June 2016

International 

(Correct as of 7 March 2014)

International goals

Honours

Club 

Lyon
Division 1 Féminine: Winner 2008–09, 2009–10, 2010–11, 2011–12, 2012–13, 2013–14, 2014–15, 2015–16, 2016—2017, 2017—2018
Coupe de France Féminine: Winner 2011–12, 2012–13, 2013–14, 2014–15, 2015–16
UEFA Women's Champions League: Winner 2010–11, 2011–12, 2015–16, 2016—2017, 2017—2018

International 
France
Cyprus Cup: Winner 2012

References

External links 

 
 
  
  
 
 
 
 
 

1983 births
Living people
French women's footballers
France women's international footballers
Sportspeople from La Rochelle
Olympique Lyonnais Féminin players
ASJ Soyaux-Charente players
2011 FIFA Women's World Cup players
Footballers at the 2012 Summer Olympics
Olympic footballers of France
Women's association football defenders
Women's association football midfielders
Division 1 Féminine players
Footballers from Nouvelle-Aquitaine